Nanzhuang Township is a rural township in Miaoli County, Taiwan.

Geography

Demographics
The population consists of Hakkas, Hoklos and the indigenous Saisiyat and Atayal people.

Administrative divisions
The township comprises nine villages: Nanfu, Nanjiang, Penglai, Shishan, Tianmei, Tung, Tunghe, Xi and Yuanlin.

Politics
The township is part of Miaoli County Constituency II electoral district for Legislative Yuan.

Transportation
 Guo-Guang Motor Transit Company

Tourist attractions
 Museum of Saisiyat Folklore
 Nanzhuang Old Street
 Nanzhuang Theater
 Quanhua Temple
 Shenxian Valley
 Shitoushan (Lion's Head Mountain) Temple
 Xiangtian Lake

Notable natives
 Chuang Chi-fa, historian

References

External links

  

Townships in Miaoli County